Randy McKellar (6 January 1962 – 18 December 1999) was a Canadian rugby union player. He played in four matches for the Canada national rugby union team from 1985 to 1987, including one match at the 1987 Rugby World Cup.

References

1962 births
1999 deaths
Canadian rugby union players
Canada international rugby union players
Sportspeople from Ontario